Yamato Station may refer to:
Yamato Station (Fukushima) (山都駅) in Fukushima, Japan connected with JR East Ban-etsu Nishi Line
Yamato Station (Ibaraki) (大和駅) in Ibaraki, Japan connected with JR East Mito Line
Yamato Station (Kanagawa) (大和駅) in Kanagawa, Japan connected with Odakyu Enoshima Line and Sagami Railway Main Line